Ponzano Monferrato is a comune (municipality) in the Province of Alessandria in the Italian region Piedmont, located about  east of Turin and about  northwest of Alessandria.

Ponzano Monferrato borders the following municipalities: Castelletto Merli, Cereseto, Mombello Monferrato, Moncalvo, and Serralunga di Crea.

References

Cities and towns in Piedmont